Darren Fleary (born 2 December 1972) is an English former professional rugby league footballer who played in the 1990s and 2000s, and coach.

Background
Darren Fleary's birth was registered in Huddersfield, West Riding of Yorkshire, England. 

Since finishing his playing career "Big Daz" Fleary has been working as a prison officer and devotes a lot of his spare time to training his legs, in particular his calves.

Playing career

International honours
Darren Fleary won caps for England while at Leeds Rhinos in the 2000 Rugby League World Cup against Australia (sub), Russia, and New Zealand (sub), and won caps for Great Britain while at Leeds Rhinos in 1998 against New Zealand, and New Zealand (sub).

Super League Grand Final appearances
Darren Fleary played right- in Leeds Rhinos' 4–10 defeat by Wigan Warriors in the 1998 Super League Grand Final during Super League IV at Old Trafford, Manchester on Saturday 24 October 1998.

Challenge Cup Final appearances
Darren Fleary played in Leeds Rhinos' 52–16 victory over London Broncos in the 1999 Challenge Cup Final during Super League V at Wembley Stadium, London on Saturday 1 May 1999, and played left- in the 18–24 defeat by Bradford Bulls in the 2000 Challenge Cup Final during Super League VI at Murrayfield Stadium, Edinburgh on Saturday 29 April 2000.

References

External links
 ĎŔƑ BBC England squad list
Fleary faces disciplinary rap
(archived by web.archive.org) Statistics at rugbyleague.co.nz
Challenge Cup teams and profiles
Darren Fleary interview for Thirteen

1972 births
Living people
Black British sportspeople
Dewsbury Rams players
England national rugby league team players
English rugby league coaches
English rugby league players
Great Britain national rugby league team players
Huddersfield Giants players
Keighley Cougars players
Leeds Rhinos players
Leigh Leopards captains
Leigh Leopards players
Rugby league players from Huddersfield
Rugby league props
Rugby league second-rows
Yorkshire rugby league team players